Vijay Satyanand Pande is a Trinidadian-American venture capitalist. Pande is the former director of the biophysics program and is best known for orchestrating the distributed computing disease research project known as Folding@home. His research is focused on distributed computing and computer-modelling of microbiology and on improving computer simulations regarding drug-binding, protein design, and synthetic bio-mimetic polymers. Pande became the ninth general partner at venture capital firm Andreessen Horowitz in November 2015. He is the founding investor of their Bio + Health Fund.

Career
Pande is an Adjunct Professor of Bioengineering at Stanford University. Previously, he was the Henry Dreyfus Professor of Chemistry and Professor of structural biology and of Computer Science. He was also director of the Biophysics program. 

Pande serves on the boards of Apeel Sciences, Bayesian Health, BioAge Labs, Citizen, Devoted Health, Freenome, Insitro, Nautilus Biotechnology, Nobell, Omada Health, Q.bio, and Scribe Therapeutics, a CRISPR company co-founded by 2020 Nobel Laureate Jennifer Doudna. He has also been a founder and advisor to  startups in Silicon Valley.

Globavir Biosciences, Inc. 
In 2014, Pande co-founded Globavir Biosciences, an infectious disease startup addressing antibiotic resistance threats in developed countries as well as needs in viral infections around the world, including Ebola and dengue fever.

Pande Lab at Stanford University 
Pande founded the Pande Lab at Stanford University. The lab brings together researchers from many departments, including Chemistry, Computer Science, Structural Biology, Physics, Biophysics, and Biochemistry.

Distributed computing 
Dr. Pande is the founder of the Folding@home research project.

The protein-folding computer simulations from the Folding@home project is said to be "quantitatively" comparable to real-world experimental results.  The method for this yield has been called a "holy grail" in computational biology.

The Folding@home project was recognized by the Guinness Book of World Records in 2007 as the most powerful distributed computing network in the world.

Pande directed the Genome@home project with the goal to understand the nature of genes and proteins by virtually designing new forms of them. Genome@home started to close as early as March 2004, after accumulating a large database of protein sequences.

Some of the programs and libraries involved are free software with GPL, LGPL, and BSD licenses, but the folding@home client and core remain proprietary.

Stanford Bitcoin Group and Bitcoin Mafia 
With colleague Balaji Srinivisan, Pande supervised the Stanford Bitcoin Group, a bitcoin research team born of hackathon activities in Pande and Srinvisan’s Stanford CS 184 class. The Stanford Bitcoin Group consisted of seven core members and included Ryan Breslow, a founder of Cognito, a developer at Coinbase and then Netflix, and a developer at Google.

Early Life and education 
Pande graduated from Langley High School's class of 1988 while growing up in McLean, Virginia. In 1992, Pande received his B.A. from Princeton University. MIT awarded him a PhD in 1995.

While in high school, Pande won fourth place in the 1988 Westinghouse Science Talent Search for a computer simulation of a space-based ballistic missile defense.

After graduating from high school in 1988, Pande worked briefly at the video game development company Naughty Dog in the early 1990s in his late teens, serving as a co-programmer and designer on their 1991 release, Rings of Power. While Pande was attending MIT and Naughty Dog was based in Boston, he played the secret boss character in the 3DO fighting game Way of the Warrior.

He is married, has two children and likes cats.

Awards
In 2002, he was named a Frederick E. Terman Fellow and an award recipient of MIT's TR100. The following year, he was awarded the Henry and Camile Dreyfus Teacher-Scholar award. In 2004, he received a Technovator award from Global Indus Technovators in its Biotech/Med/Healthcare category. In 2006, Pande was awarded the Irving Sigal Young Investigator Award from the Protein Society. In 2008, he was named "Netxplorateur of 2008". Also in 2008 he was given the Thomas Kuhn Paradigm Shift Award and became a Fellow of the American Physical Society. Pande received the 2012 Michael and Kate Bárány Award for developing computational models for protein and RNA. He is the second person to ever win both the "Protein Society Young Investigator Award" and "Biophysical Society Young Investigator" award. In 2015, Pande received the DeLano Award for Computational Biosciences, as well as the Camille and Henry Dreyfus Distinguished Chair in Chemistry.

References

Bibliography 

 Ramsundar, Bharath (2019). Deep Learning for the Life Sciences : Applying Deep Learning to Genomics, Microscopy, Drug Discovery, and More. Peter Eastman, Patrick Walters, Vijay Pande (First edition ed.).O'Reilly Media, Inc. ISBN 978-1-4920-3980-8.
 Pande, Vijay (2012). Physical chemistry principles (Second edition ed.). CreateSpace Independent Publishing Platform. ISBN 978-1-4810-2733-5. 
 An introduction to Markov State Models and their application to long timescale molecular simulation. Gregory R. Bowman, Vijay Pande, Frank Noé. Dordrecht. 2014. Springer. ISBN 978-94-007-7606-7.  
 Grosberg, A. IU. (1994). Statistical physics of macromolecules. A. R. Khokhlov. New York: AIP Press. ISBN 1-56396-071-0.

External links
 Folding@home website
 Professor Pande's Stanford Faculty Page
 Professor Pande’s Google Scholar Page
 Interview of Pande
 Vijay S. Pande at MobyGames

1970 births
American biophysicists
American people of Indian descent
Living people
Massachusetts Institute of Technology alumni
People from McLean, Virginia
Princeton University alumni
Stanford University Department of Chemistry faculty
Stanford University School of Engineering faculty
Stanford University School of Medicine faculty
American video game programmers
Naughty Dog people
Andreessen Horowitz
Scientists from Virginia